Central Lampung Regency is a regency of the province of Lampung, on Sumatra, Indonesia. It has an area of  4,545.50 km2 and had a population of 1,170,048 people at the 2010 census and 1,460,045 at the 2020 census; the official estimate as at mid 2021 was 1,477,395. The regency seat is the town of Gunung Sugih.

Administrative Districts 
Central Lampung Regency consists of twenty-eight districts (kecamatan), tabulated below with their areas and their populations at the 2010 census and 2020 census, together with the official estimates as at mid 2021. The table also includes the locations of the district administrative centres, the number of villages (rural desa and urban kelurahan) in each district, and its post code.

Note: (a) includes the urban villages (kelurahan) of Bandar Jaya Barat, Bandar Jaya Timur, Yukum Jaya and Poncowati, all located to the north of Gunung Sugih.

History
In August 2009, a former senior regency official - Herman Hazbullah, former head of the Revenue and Financial Management Agency - was arrested for graft.

References

Regencies of Lampung